Douglas William Bradley (born 7 September 1954) is an English actor and author, best known for his role as the lead Cenobite "Pinhead" in the Hellraiser film series and for narration on various Cradle of Filth albums. He is also starring in the upcoming animated film Dagon: Troll World Chronicles as the forest monster Goeyre Heddagh.

Early life
Bradley was born in Liverpool and attended Quarry Bank High School.

Career
Bradley is best known for playing the role of Pinhead, the lead Cenobite, in the first eight Hellraiser films, as well as Captain Elliot Spencer in two of the films, Hellbound: Hellraiser II (1988) and Hellraiser III: Hell on Earth (1992). He is one of only six actors to play the same horror character at least six consecutive times, the others being Christopher Lee (who portrayed Count Dracula), Robert Englund (who portrayed Freddy Krueger), Warwick Davis (who portrayed the Leprechaun), Brad Dourif (who portrayed Chucky) and Tobin Bell (who portrayed John Kramer/"Jigsaw"). Due to his eventual skill at application and removal of the Pinhead appliances and costume, he has been credited in some of the Hellraiser films as an assistant make-up artist named Bill Bradley, using his middle name.

Bradley appeared as a gym teacher in an advertisement for Direct Line insurance in the UK. He has performed narrations on several songs by Cradle of Filth, an English extreme metal band. The first was 2000's "Her Ghost in the Fog", as well as "Death Magick for Adepts" and "Tortured Soul Asylum", from the album Midian. However, he could not appear in the music video and was replaced by actor David McEwen.

Bradley also appeared on "Swansong for a Raven" and "Satyriasis" from the band's 2004 album, Nymphetamine. In 2006, he lent his narrations to "Rise of the Pentagram" and "Tonight in Flames" from the album Thornography. Continuing in this vein, Bradley has contributed guest vocals to Cradle of Filth's 2008 album Godspeed on the Devil's Thunder, on all songs except "Tragic Kingdom". He returned for their 2021 album, Existence is Futile, on the songs "Sisters of the Mist" and "Suffer Our Dominian".

Bradley has appeared in many short horror films, such as Red Lines and On Edge. He is a member of the UK animation company Renga Media, makers of the independent Dominator films and shorts, dividing job roles between producer and voice actor. He voiced the Loc-Nar in the short animated crossover Heavy Metal vs. Dominator, in which characters from the Dominator universe meet and fight with characters from the film Heavy Metal 2000.

After his roles in the Hellraiser films and the 1990 horror film Nightbreed, 2006 saw Bradley star in Pumpkinhead: Ashes to Ashes and 2008 saw Bradley once again returning to Clive Barker's cinematic universe by way of a featured appearance in Book of Blood. He had a small guest star appearance in the 2008 black comic horror The Cottage. In 2010, he starred in the Anglo-Spanish horror film Exorcismus, and he joined the Nazi zombie horror The 4th Reich in March 2010.

In 2011, he played a man called the Doctor in the British film noir Jack Falls. In June 2011, it was announced that Bradley would be providing a voice-over for an independent film called Lucifer's Unholy Desire, as well as performing in the film The Reverend. In 2012, he played "Maynard" in the fifth film of the Wrong Turn series, Wrong Turn 5: Bloodlines. In 2013, he performed in the indie film Scream Park.

Bradley voiced the Sith Emperor for the massively multiplayer online role-playing game Star Wars: The Old Republic, based in the Star Wars universe.

In 2018, Bradley joined Blackcraft Wrestling as “The Preacher”, a cult leader who acts as a General Manager type figure to the promotion.

In 2020, he created a YouTube channel on which he reads books and poems out loud. He returned on Cradle of Filth's 2021 album Existence Is Futile, providing narration for the track "Suffer Our Dominion" and the bonus track "Sisters of the Mist".

In 2022, Bradley voiced the character Goayre Heddagh alongside actor Tim Curry in the animated horror film Dagon Troll World Chronicles.

In 2023 Bradley will be playing Batman villain Joe Chill in the CW television show Gotham Knights. This portrayals will be different than other live action versions. The actor says the episode he will be introduced in is titled "A Chill over Gotham".

Writing
Bradley is the author of Sacred Monsters: Behind the Mask of the Horror Actor, which explores the history of masks in society and their applications in horror films.

Personal life
Bradley is a longtime close friend of novelist Clive Barker, the two having met when they attended secondary school. He has worked with Barker in various projects since the early 1970s, most notably Hellraiser, which is adapted from Barker's novella The Hellbound Heart. He lives in Pittsburgh, Pennsylvania, and is married to Steph Sciullo.

Filmography

References

External links
 
 

1954 births
Male actors from Liverpool
English male film actors
English male soap opera actors
English expatriates in the United States
Living people
People educated at Calderstones School
People educated at Quarry Bank High School